Penelope Kenny (died December 27, 1739) was executed by hanging for the murder of her child in New Hampshire along with Sarah Simpson, who was also convicted of murdering her child.

See also
 Capital punishment in New Hampshire
 Capital punishment in the United States
 List of people executed in New Hampshire

References

External links
Executions in the U.S. 1608-1987: The Espy File (by state) (PDF)

1739 deaths
18th-century executions of American people
18th-century executions by the United States
American female murderers
American murderers of children
American people executed for murder
Executed American women
Executed people from New Hampshire
Filicides in the United States
People convicted of murder by New Hampshire
People executed by New Hampshire by hanging
People executed by the Province of New Hampshire
People executed by the Thirteen Colonies by hanging
Year of birth unknown